The City Academy, Hackney is a coeducational secondary school and sixth form with academy status, located in the Homerton area of the London Borough of Hackney, England.

The school was first opened in 2009 in a new building. The school is sponsored by the City of London Corporation and KPMG. Anna Sarchet is the current Academy Principal The City of London Corporation also sponsors City of London Academy Islington and City of London Academy, Southwark.

City Academy, Hackney has a specialism in business and financial services, but includes the full range of subjects that are found in any state school.

. The school is in the top 5 chart of the country  and is aiming to be in top 3. The school opened a sixth form building in October 2016; they named it after the old principal (Mark Emmerson) " The Mark Emmerson Sixth Form Block ".

The houses within the school represent that of the doors to the City Of London.

Standards
The school was assessed as "Outstanding" in a 2012 Ofsted inspection.

References

External links
City Academy, Hackney official website

Secondary schools in the London Borough of Hackney
Academies in the London Borough of Hackney
Educational institutions established in 2009
2009 establishments in England
Homerton